Golden Lotus Award for Best Actor is one of the main categories of competition of the Golden Lotus Awards. It is awarded to leading male actor(s) who have outstanding performance in motion pictures.

Award winners and nominees

2000s

2009 (1st)

2010s

2010 (2nd)

2011 (3rd)

2012 (4th)

2013 (5th)

2014 (6th)

2015 (7th)

2016 (8th)

2017 (9th)

2018 (10th)

2019 (11th)

References

External links

Golden Lotus Awards
Film awards for lead actor
Awards established in 2009
2009 establishments in Macau